Much insight in quantum mechanics can be gained from understanding the closed-form solutions to the time-dependent non-relativistic Schrödinger equation. It takes the form

Stationary states of this equation are found by solving the time-independent  Schrödinger equation,

which is an eigenvalue equation. Very often, only numerical solutions to the Schrödinger equation can be found for a given physical system and its associated potential energy. However, there exists a subset of physical systems for which the form of the eigenfunctions and their associated energies, or eigenvalues, can be found. These quantum-mechanical systems with analytical solutions are listed below.

Solvable systems 

The two-state quantum system (the simplest possible quantum system)
The free particle
The delta potential
The double-well Dirac delta potential
The particle in a box / infinite potential well
The finite potential well
The one-dimensional triangular potential
The particle in a ring or ring wave guide
The particle in a spherically symmetric potential
The quantum harmonic oscillator
The quantum harmonic oscillator with an applied uniform field
The hydrogen atom or hydrogen-like atom e.g. positronium
The hydrogen atom in a spherical cavity with Dirichlet boundary conditions
The particle in a one-dimensional lattice (periodic potential)
The particle in a one-dimensional lattice of finite length
The Morse potential
 The Mie potential
The step potential
The linear rigid rotor  
The symmetric top
The Hooke's atom
The Spherium atom
Zero range interaction in a harmonic trap
The quantum pendulum
The rectangular potential barrier
The Pöschl–Teller potential
The Inverse square root potential
 Multistate Landau–Zener models
The Luttinger liquid (the only exact quantum mechanical solution to a model including interparticle interactions)

See also 
 List of quantum-mechanical potentials – a list of physically relevant potentials without regard to analytic solubility
 List of integrable models
 WKB approximation
 Quasi-exactly-solvable problems

References

Reading materials 

 

Quantum models
Quantum-mechanical systems with analytical solutions